Triptyque may refer to:

 Triptyque Ardennais, road cycling race held since 1959 in Belgium
 Le Triptyque des Monts et Châteaux, road cycling race held since 1996 in Belgium
 Triptych (film) (Triptyque in French), 2013 Canadian drama film